Iqalulialuk formerly Ekalulia Island is an uninhabited island within the Arctic Archipelago in the Kitikmeot Region, Nunavut. It is located in Bathurst Inlet. Other islands in the vicinity include Algaq, Kanuyak Island, Iglorua Island, Shoe Island, Walrus Island, Marcet Island, Aupilaktuq, and Qikiqtaryuaq.

References 

Islands of Bathurst Inlet
Uninhabited islands of Kitikmeot Region